Tintern is a village in the community of Wye Valley, on the west bank of the River Wye in Monmouthshire, Wales, close to the border with England, about  north of Chepstow. It is popular with tourists, in particular for the scenery and the ruined Tintern Abbey.
Modern Tintern has been formed through the coalescence of two historic villages; Tintern Parva, forming the northern end of the village, and Chapel Hill, which forms the southern end. The village is designated as a Conservation Area.

In 2022 the community was renamed from "Tintern" to "Wye Valley" and had boundary changes.

History

Early history
A ford across the navigable and tidal River Wye was in use in Roman times, close to the site of the abbey. After the Romans withdrew from Wales, the kingdom of Gwent emerged, and, according to tradition, in the 6th century one of their kings, Tewdrig, came out of retirement as a Tintern hermit to defeat the invading Saxons in battle, perhaps at a site known today as Pont y Saison (Bridge of the Saxons) in the Angiddy Valley. The name Tintern may derive from the Welsh din + d/teyrn, meaning "rocks of the king".

The abbey

Tintern Abbey was founded beside the river by Walter de Clare on 9 May 1131, during the reign of King Henry I. It was the second Cistercian foundation in Britain, and its monks came from a daughter house of Cîteaux in France.

The present-day remains at Tintern are a mixture of building works covering several centuries. Between 1270 and 1301 the abbey was rebuilt, and when it was completed around four hundred monks lived in the complex. The abbey's land was divided into agricultural units or granges, and local people provided farm labour and served the abbey and its many visitors. For 400 years, it dominated the economy of its surrounding area. During some of this period the area was contested between the Welsh and English, the closest battle being won in 1404 by Owain Glyndŵr, at Craig y Dorth near Monmouth. The area also had to contend with the Black Death, and it is suspected that the neighbouring village of Penterry disappeared at that time. The abbey remained in operation until the Dissolution of the Monasteries in 1536.

Brass, iron and wire works
Though it has been suggested that the monks or lay brethren of Tintern Abbey exploited the woodlands and river power for operating iron forges, evidence of this is lacking. Industrial activity began in 1568 when the newly established Company of Mineral and Battery Works built a wireworks. It is possible that brass was made, but the works mainly made iron wire. This was used for a wide variety of industries with essential goods: cards for the woollen industry, nails, pins, knitting needles and fish hooks. The site was convenient, because the Wye offered transportation, the Angiddy stream provided water power, trees in nearby woods were used for charcoal fuel, and the locality provided a ready supply of minerals. The company began letting their works. Farmers of the works in the 17th century included Sir Basil Brooke, Thomas Foley, the important ironmaster and his son Thomas Foley. A blast furnace and forges were built in the valley in the 17th century and operated with the wireworks until the end of the 19th century.  

For 300 years, the numerous works and forges along the Angidy Valley dominated the village and surrounding communities. A branch from the Wye Valley Railway to the Lower Wireworks by way of a bridge (the 'Wireworks Bridge') was completed in 1875, but too late to stop them going out of business. In 1878 a new company leased the site to manufacture tinplate although by 1895 it was reported as closed and only some ruins, associated ponds, leats and culverts are now visible. The bridge was used in the early 20th century as a horse-drawn tramway and now carries a tourist footpath to the opposite bank. In March 2021, discovery of an underground structure paralleling Angiddy Brook was initially thought to be a "secret medieval tunnel system".   Subsequent investigation identified the structure as an original leat system for one of the "missing" mills associated with Tintern Abbey.

The tourist industry
By the late 18th century, tourism had started in the Wye Valley, with many visitors travelling on the river to see the abbey and other "picturesque" sites in the area. William Wordsworth stayed in the village in 1798 and wrote Lines Written a Few Miles above Tintern Abbey. The completion of the turnpike road (now the A466) in the valley in 1829, and the arrival of the Wye Valley Railway in the 1870s, greatly increased the number of visitors, and tourism became the mainstay of Tintern's economy and remains so today. The Royal George Hotel is one of several hotels, inns, and guest-houses located beside the main road.

Areas of interest

Tintern Abbey

Tintern Abbey was founded on 9 May 1131 by Walter de Clare, Lord of Chepstow. It was the first Cistercian foundation in Wales, and only the second in Britain (after Waverley Abbey).

The abbey fell into ruin after the Dissolution of the Monasteries in the 16th century. Its remains have been celebrated in poetry and painting from the 18th century onwards. In 1984, Cadw took over responsibility for managing the site. Tintern Abbey is visited by approximately 70,000 people every year.

St Mary the Virgin on Chapel Hill
The ruins of St. Mary's Church can also be seen on a hill to the west of the abbey. Medieval in origin, the church was virtually rebuilt in 1866-68 by John Prichard. While much of the church is still clearly visible today, a fire in 1977 left the building in ruins. The churchyard is now maintained by volunteers.

Water Mill
A disused water-driven mill lies in the Abbey Mill area northwest of the abbey. Visitor information and shops can be found close by.

Parva Farm Vineyard
The village also boasts an award-winning vineyard.

The Moon and Sixpence
The former public house, The Moon and Sixpence, was originally known as the Mason's Arms, but changed its name in 1948 following a visit by Somerset Maugham, author of the 1919 novel of the same name. It has been converted into a group of three private houses.

St Michael's Church, Tintern Parva
The church of St Michael, Tintern Parva dates back to mediaeval times (a church on the site was recorded circa 1348). It was substantially rebuilt in 1846 (although pictorial records suggest it was relatively similar in appearance before and after the rebuilding) and has remained largely unchanged since. The south porch may date to the fifteenth century. The churchyard includes a variety of nineteenth century memorials, including one for John Loraine Baldwin, former warden of the abbey.

Old railway station
Tintern railway station was on the former Wye Valley Railway. From the north, approaching Tintern, immediately after Tintern Station the railway crossed the Wye to bypass the village on the other bank. Closed to passengers in 1959, the station, a mile's walk above Tintern, functions as a tourist centre.

Walks
Tintern is home to an extensive network of local footpaths, linking with two long-distance paths: On the Welsh side, the Wye Valley Walk passes nearby, and on the English side, the Offa's Dyke path is also near. The former wireworks railway bridge north of the abbey crosses the River Wye, and is open to the public. It leads - on the English side of the river - to several clearly marked walking paths, most notably a path to the "Devil's Pulpit", and other paths which also lead to Offa's Dyke.

References

External links

 Tintern Village Website
 Tintern Conservation Area survey
 The BBC Virtual Tintern
 Genuki info on Tintern
 Genuki info on Chapel Hill
 Tintern railway photos and info
 Kelly's 1901 Directory of Monmouthshire
 Ruins of St. Marys, Chapel Hill
 www.geograph.co.uk : photos of Tintern and surrounding area

Villages in Monmouthshire